Mark Stuart Smith (born December 4, 1975) was a Zimbabwean cricketer. He was a right-handed batsman and a right-arm medium-pace bowler who played for Matabeleland. He was born in Bulawayo.

Smith made a single first-class appearance for the team, during the 1994-95 season, against Mashonaland Under-24s. Batting as a tailender, Smith finished not out in both innings of the match, scoring just one run in the two innings in which he played.

External links
Mark Smith at CricketArchive 

1975 births
Living people
Zimbabwean cricketers
Matabeleland cricketers